The Arthur Ross Greenhouse is a greenhouse located on the fifth floor of Milbank Hall at Barnard College, New York City. Originally a rooftop garden, it is used for botanical research and hosts a collection of approximately 650 species of plants.

History

Origin and botanical use
First established in 1897 as a rooftop garden, its facilities were upgraded for the first time in 1928 by professor Edmund Ware Sinnott, who used the greenhouse to conduct his pioneering studies on squash genetics. After Sinnott left in 1940 to become the chair of the botany department at Yale University, it continued to be used for research and teaching by both faculty and students at Barnard, though over time it deteriorated and become energy-inefficient.

Replacement
In 1996, trustee Arthur Ross donated $1 million to replace the greenhouse with a new, state-of-the-art facility, which was completed and dedicated in 1998. The new greenhouse is computer-controlled, with automated temperature control, ventilation, solar shading, and watering. It occupies about 3,400 square feet of space, with a 24-foot-tall central conservatory, in addition to two smaller research bays on either side. Its taller design and better temperature controls have allowed it to house both taller and more diverse plants than its predecessor, which was limited to collecting tropical plants.

Collection
In total, the greenhouse's collection includes roughly 650 different species. Among its notable specimens includes an A. titanum named Berani, which was gifted to Barnard by the Brooklyn Botanic Garden in 2013 and bloomed for the first time in 2020. Its name derives from the Indonesian word for brave.

References 

Barnard College
Columbia University campus
Greenhouses in New York (state)
1897 establishments in New York City